Locked Out may refer to:
 Locked Out (film), a 2006 French film directed by and starring Albert Dupontel
 "Locked Out" (song), a 1993 song by rock group Crowded House

See also
 Lockout (disambiguation)